The R612 is a regional route in KwaZulu-Natal, South Africa that connects Park Rynie with Bulwer via Donnybrook, Ixopo, Highflats and Umzinto.

Route
Its south-eastern terminus is at an intersection with the R102 in Park Rynie and heads in a westerly direction. It crosses with the N2 at an off-ramp west of Park Rynie and after 6 kilometres it enters Umzinto. After Umzinto, it goes through the hilly rural area of the South Coast where it notably passes through Highflats and heads in a north-westerly direction. It crosses the R56 (to Kokstad and Pietermaritzburg) in Ixopo and after 35 kilometres it goes through Donnybrook before ending at an intersection with the R617, 5 kilometres south of Bulwer.

Towns
 Donnybrook
 Dumisa
 Highflats
 Ixopo
 Park Rynie
 Umzinto

References

Regional Routes in KwaZulu-Natal